West Virginia Route 869 is a short, one mile (1.6 km) state highway in Putnam County, West Virginia that connects U.S. Route 35 and West Virginia Route 62 via the Lower Buffalo Bridge (officially the Johnathon David Higginbotham Memorial Bridge) over the Kanawha River. The route itself is unsigned on the bridge. The road was commissioned in 1998 to provide an alternate route for the fragile Winfield Bridge for trucks hauling goods for the Toyota Plant in Buffalo.

History
The highway at its western end formerly used a portion of existing US 35 to meet WV 817. WV 817 was formerly signed as US 35, but was resigned as WV 817 when a 4-lane section of US 35 opened.

Major intersections

References

869
Transportation in Putnam County, West Virginia
State highways in the United States shorter than one mile